Harold E. Wise (1903 – February 27, 1969) was an American football coach. He served as the head football coach at Ohio University in Athens, Ohio from 1947 to 1948, compiling a record of 6–11–1.

Wise was a 1928 graduate of Ohio University and was an associate director of the school's alumni board. A native of Wheeling, West Virginia, Wise later worked for Columbia Gas of Ohio. He died on February 27, 1969, at his home in Columbus, Ohio.

Head coaching record

College football

References

External links
 

1903 births
1969 deaths
Ohio Bobcats baseball coaches
Ohio Bobcats baseball players
Ohio Bobcats football coaches
Ohio Bobcats football players
Ohio Bobcats men's basketball coaches
Ohio Bobcats men's basketball players
High school baseball coaches in the United States
High school basketball coaches in Ohio
High school football coaches in Ohio
People from Athens, Ohio
Sportspeople from Wheeling, West Virginia
Players of American football from Ohio
Baseball players from Ohio
Basketball players from Ohio